Gard Sveen (born 1969) is a Norwegian crime fiction writer.

He made his literary debut in 2013, with the novel Den siste pilegrimen. In 2015 he wrote the crime novel Helvete åpent. For Den siste pilegrimen, he was awarded the Riverton Prize in 2013, and the Glass Key award in 2014.

References

1969 births
Living people
Norwegian male novelists
Norwegian crime fiction writers
21st-century Norwegian novelists
21st-century Norwegian male writers